Robert William Forrest (1831 – 6 July 1908) was the Dean of Worcester from 1891  until his death.

Forrest was born  in Rostellan  and educated at Trinity College Dublin and then began his ordained ministry as a curate at Holy Trinity, Dublin, after which he held incumbencies at Liverpool and St Jude's South Kensington. He was also a prebendary of St Paul's Cathedral and an Honorary Chaplain to Queen Victoria.

References

People from County Cork
Alumni of Trinity College Dublin
Honorary Chaplains to the Queen
Deans of Worcester
1831 births
1908 deaths
Date of birth missing